The 2017 TEAN International was a professional tennis tournament played on outdoor clay courts. It was the 22nd edition of the tournament which was part of the 2017 ATP Challenger Tour. It took place in Alphen aan den Rijn, Netherlands, on 5 – 10 September 2017.

Singles main draw entrants

Seeds

 1 Rankings are as of 28 August 2017.

Other entrants
The following players received wildcards into the singles main draw:
  Thiemo de Bakker
  Tommy Robredo
  Jelle Sels
  Boy Westerhof

The following players received entry into the singles main draw using protected rankings:
  Flavio Cipolla
  Daniel Muñoz de la Nava

The following players received entry from the qualifying draw:
  Julien Cagnina
  Iván Endara
  Kevin Krawietz
  Jürgen Zopp

Champions

Singles 

  Jürgen Zopp def.  Tommy Robredo 6–3, 6–2.

Doubles 

  Botic van de Zandschulp /  Boy Westerhof def.  Alexandar Lazov /  Volodymyr Uzhylovskyi 7–6(8–6), 7–5.

External links 
 Official website

2017
TEAN International
2017 in Dutch tennis